Youth Is Only Ever Fun in Retrospect is the debut studio album by English band Sundara Karma. It was released in January 2017 under Chess Club Records. In  2020, the album was certified Silver in the UK  for sales of over 60.000.

Track listing

Charts

Accolades

References

External links 
 

2017 debut albums
Sundara Karma albums